The 2023 season is Júbilo Iwata's 51st season in existence and the club's first season back in the second division of Japanese football. In addition to the domestic league, Júbilo Iwata will participate in this season's edition of the Emperor's Cup.

Players

First-team squad

Out on loan

Transfers
Due to a ban imposed by FIFA, after an illegal breach of contract between Fabián González and an unnamed Thai club, Júbilo is unable to make any new signings from outside of the 2022 club system during both transfer windows of the 2023 season. Players out on loan can normally return to the club. Tokyo International University graduate Shu Morooka was scheduled to join Júbilo for the 2023 season, but as the club received a transfer ban, his provisional contract with Júbilo was cancelled, and he later joined Kashima Antlers. The club filed an appeal about the CAS decision over the subject, but it was denied.

Pre-season and friendlies

Competitions

Overview

J2 League

League table

Results summary

Results by round

Matches
The league fixtures were announced on 20 January 2023.

Emperor's Cup

Since they are a J2 League club, they are granted a bye from prefectural qualifications and automatic Second Round spots in the competition.

J.League Cup

Goalscorers 
Updated as of 4 March 2023.

References

External links

Júbilo Iwata seasons
Júbilo Iwata